Salome High School is a high school in Salome, Arizona. It is the only school in the Bicentennial Union High School District #76.

Athletics 

Salome is a member of the Arizona Interscholastic Association and competes as the Frogs in conference 1A - West in these sports:
 Boys: baseball, basketball, football, soccer, track & field, volleyball, wrestling
 Girls: basketball, soccer, softball, track & field, volleyball.

Arizona state championships
 Basketball (Boys): 1981, 1988
 Football: 1980
 Track & Field (Boys): 1981
 Track & Field (Girls): 1976, 2003

References

External links 
 

Public high schools in Arizona
Schools in La Paz County, Arizona